Edelbert Dinha (born 13 March 1973 in Salisbury) is a former Zimbabwean professional footballer who played as a midfielder.

He works at Shumba Sports Management. He is the agent of Archford Gutu and Rodreck Mutuma.

International career
He was a member of the Zimbabwean 2006 African Nations Cup team, who finished bottom of their group in the first round of competition, thus failing to secure qualification for the quarter-finals.

Clubs
1993–1994 : CAPS United FC
1994–1995 : Petrolofisi
1994–1995 : Sokół Pniewy
1995–1996 : Sokół Tychy
1996–1998 : CAPS United FC
1998–1999 : Seven Stars
1999–2002 : Ajax Cape Town
2002–2006 : Orlando Pirates
2006–2007 : FC AK
2008 : Mpumalanga Black Aces

References

External links

1973 births
Living people
Sportspeople from Harare
Zimbabwean footballers
Zimbabwean expatriate footballers
Zimbabwe international footballers
Association football midfielders
CAPS United players
Sokół Pniewy players
Orlando Pirates F.C. players
Cape Town Spurs F.C. players
2006 Africa Cup of Nations players
F.C. AK players
Expatriate footballers in Poland